Labshare consortium is a laboratory sharing initiative established by the Federal Commonwealth of Australia Government's Department of Education, Employment and Workplace Relations by their Diversity and Structural Adjustment Fund awarded the five Australian Technology Network Universities: University of South Australia, Royal Melbourne Institute of Technology, University of Technology Sydney, Curtin University of Technology and Queensland University of Technology, which supported the national sharing of remote labs as a consortium of Australian Technology Network Universities who would share remote laboratories.

The University of South Australia was first to establish its NetLab remote lab in 2008.

References

Related pages
Remote laboratory
Engineering law
Engineering management
Engineering education
University of South Australia
Australian Technology Network

External links 

 
 Netlab from University of South Australia
 Open source code to Sahara

Engineering education
Higher education in Australia
Laboratories in Australia
Universities in Australia
2009 establishments in Australia